The Conservatorio Nacional de Música (National Conservatory of Music, in Spanish) is a music conservatory located in the Polanco neighborhood of Mexico City, Federal District, Mexico.

History
The Conservatory was founded on July 1, 1866, by the priest, teacher and choir conductor Agustín Caballero, with the support of the Mexican Philharmonic Society (Sociedad Filarmónica Mexicana) and Emperor Maximilian I.

It is the oldest official school of music in Mexico City (the oldest conservatory in Mexico and in the Americas is the Conservatorio de las Rosas in Morelia, Michoacán, Mexico, created in 1743), and it is the host institution of the oldest symphonic orchestra in the country (Orquesta Sinfónica del Conservatorio Nacional, founded in 1881).

Since March 18, 1949, its campus is located in the Polanco section of Mexico City in an architectural complex designed and built by Mario Pani.

Noted alumni

 Juan Arvizu, lyric tenor.
 Carlos Chávez, composer and conductor
 Julián Carrillo, composer, conductor and theorist
 Nestor Mesta Chayres, lyric tenor 
 Plácido Domingo, opera singer and conductor
 Blas Galindo, composer and conductor
 Luis Garcia-Renart, cellist
 Mario Lavista, composer and teacher
 Eduardo Mata, composer and conductor
 José Pablo Moncayo, composer and conductor
 Jorge Federico Osorio, pianista
 Carlos Prieto, cellist
 Carlos Miguel Prieto, conductor
 Felix Carrasco, conductor
 Silvestre Revueltas, composer and conductor
 Antonio Castillo de la Gala, pianist and composer
 Eduardo Diazmuñoz, composer, conductor and arranger
 María Teresa Rodríguez, pianist
 Javier Torres Maldonado, composer
 Luis Humberto Ramos, clarinetist
 Humberto Hernández Medrano, composer
 Salvador Contreras, clarinetist
 Ricardo Bernal, tenor
 Saul Bitran, violinist
 Rolando Villazón, tenor
 Jose carlos de la vega basulto, pianist
 Francisco de Paula León Olea, composer
 Arturo Márquez, composer
 Jorge Alejandro Fernández, trumpet, singing
 Alfredo Daza, baritone
Verónica Tapia, composer
 Gloria Tapia, composer, musicologist

Juan R. Ramírez Hernández, violinist, composer, conductor

Noted professors
(main discipline(s) indicated)

 Gerónimo Baqueiro Foster, music history 
 Eliosa de Baqueiro, music history
 Gustavo Campa, composition and director of the Conservatorio 
 Julián Carrillo, composition
 Carlos Chávez, composition
 Ernesto Enríquez, music history 
 Blas Galindo, composition
 Rodolfo Halffter, composition, music theory
 Eduardo Hernández Moncada, choir conducting, piano, harmony, opera ensembles
 Candelario Huízar, harmony, counterpoint and analysis
 Mario Lavista, composition
 Agustín Loera, Mexican culture history
 Armando Luna Ponce, composition
 Manuel María Ponce, composition
 Carlos Vázquez, piano
 Laura Mendez
 Vicente T. Mendoza, music history
 José Pablo Moncayo, composition, conducting
 Salvador Novo, Mexican literature
 Julián Orbón, composition
 Angelica Morales von Sauer, piano
 Carlos Pellicer, Mexican literature
 Silvestre Revueltas, violin, chamber music, composition, conducting
 María Teresa Rodríguez, piano
 José Rolón, harmony, counterpoint and fugue 
 Jesús C. Romero, music history
 Luis Sandi, choir conducting 
 Henryk Szeryng, violin
 Victor Loyo, piano, guitar
 Antonio Castillo de la Gala, piano, composition
 Jorge Alejandro Fernández, trumpet, singing
 Gloria Tapia, composer, musicologist

References

Torres-Chibras, Armando Ramon. 2002. "José Pablo Moncayo, Mexican Composer and Conductor: A Survey of His Life with a Historical Perspective of His Time." DMA diss., University of Missouri, Kansas City. Ann Arbor, MI: University Microfilms International.

External links
Official web-site of the NCM-Mexico alumni

Music schools in Mexico
Performing arts education in Mexico
National Conservatory of Music of Mexico
Miguel Hidalgo, Mexico City
Educational institutions established in 1866
1866 establishments in Mexico